The Osered is a river in Voronezh Oblast in Russia. It is a tributary of the Don.

References

Rivers of Voronezh Oblast